Neofytos Kyriakou  (Greek: Νεόφυτος Κυριάκου; born 2 October 1997) is a Cypriot footballer who plays for the Cyprus under-17 national team as an attacking midfielder.

Career

Anorthosis Famagusta
Neofytos Kyriakou made his debut for Anorthosis in a match against Doxa Katokopia.

External links

1997 births
Living people
Cypriot footballers
Anorthosis Famagusta F.C. players
Cypriot First Division players
Association football midfielders
Doxa Katokopias FC players